Hélio José Vaz (born 19 December 1990) is a Portuguese footballer who plays for Olímpico Montijo as a forward.

Club career
Born in Montijo, Setúbal District, Vaz started playing with hometown club C.D. Montijo, whose academy he joined at the age of 12. In 2008, for his last year as a junior, he signed with S.L. Benfica. Upon his arrival, he said that representing the latter was always a dream of his, and that he hoped it would also open the doors of the under-18 national team.

At the end of his youth career, and as Vaz was one of highest goalscorers throughout the season only behind Nélson Oliveira, Benfica decided to offer him a professional contract and loan him. He started out at C.D. Mafra, whom he represented in the opening stages of 2009–10. Due to the lack of playing time, he moved to fellow third division team C.D. Tondela for the remainder of the season.

Vaz was a regular fixture in the early training sessions of Benfica's main squad the following campaign, but in January 2011 he was loaned to Casa Pia A.C. of the third tier. For 2011–12, in also on loan, he joined Segunda Liga's Atlético Clube de Portugal, making his professional debut on 7 August 2011 by coming on as a 72nd-minute substitute in a 1–1 away draw against Portimonense S.C. in the first round of the Taça da Liga.

Subsequently, Vaz opted to terminate his contract with Benfica and join division three club U.D. Leiria, scoring ten goals in his debut season to help to a seventh-place finish. His performances attracted interest abroad, and he signed with Doxa Katokopias FC in the Cypriot First Division on a two-year deal, only to return to his previous team three months later.

Vaz moved to G.D. Peniche still in the third division at the beginning of the 2016 winter transfer window.

References

External links

1990 births
Living people
People from Montijo, Portugal
Portuguese footballers
Association football forwards
Liga Portugal 2 players
Segunda Divisão players
C.D. Montijo players
Clube Olímpico do Montijo players
S.L. Benfica footballers
C.D. Mafra players
C.D. Tondela players
Casa Pia A.C. players
Atlético Clube de Portugal players
U.D. Leiria players
G.D. Peniche players
S.C.U. Torreense players
GS Loures players
Lusitano G.C. players
C.D. Cova da Piedade players
Doxa Katokopias FC players
Portuguese expatriate footballers
Expatriate footballers in Cyprus
Portuguese expatriate sportspeople in Cyprus
Sportspeople from Setúbal District